The Wushe Incident Memorial Park is a memorial park in Ren'ai Township, Nantou County, Taiwan commemorating the Musha Incident in 1930.

History

The park was set up by the government to commemorate the Seediq people who perished during the incident. One of the notable tomb in the park belongs to Mona Rudao, which was erected in 1974.

See also
 List of tourist attractions in Taiwan

References

Buildings and structures in Nantou County
Memorial parks in Taiwan